Emanuel Maximiliano Ribero (born 22 December 1997) is an Argentine professional footballer who plays as an attacking midfielder for Spanish club CF Intercity.

Career
Ribero began in the youth system of Newell's Old Boys. He made his professional debut in June 2017, featuring for the final thirteen minutes of a 4–1 home victory over Central Norte in the Copa Argentina. Ribero was selected in the Argentine Primera División for the first time in the following November, with the midfielder playing in a home loss to Belgrano on 17 November. He made a further appearance in 2018–19 against Argentinos Juniors, prior to departing on loan at the start of 2019–20 to Sportivo Las Parejas in Torneo Federal A. Twenty-one total appearances followed. Shortly after, he signed permanently with the club.

At the end of January 2022, Ribero joined Spanish Segunda División RFEF club CF Intercity on a deal until the end of June 2022.

Career statistics
.

References

External links

1997 births
Living people
Argentine footballers
Argentine expatriate footballers
Sportspeople from Misiones Province
Association football midfielders
Argentine Primera División players
Torneo Federal A players
Newell's Old Boys footballers
Sportivo Las Parejas footballers
Argentine expatriate sportspeople in Spain
Expatriate footballers in Spain
CF Intercity players